Al Kikume (9 October 1894 – 27 March 1972), born Elmer Kikume Gozier, was an American actor and stuntman of Hawaiian descent. He was born in  Topeka, Kansas and died in Los Angeles.  Beginning with his first credited role, in the independently produced Tarzan the Fearless (1933), Kikume was a regular performer in Hollywood jungle movies during the 1930s, 1940s and 1950s.

Partial filmography
 Tarzan the Fearless (1933)
 The Perils of Pauline (1933) serial
 The Hurricane (1937)
 Mandrake the Magician (1939) serial
 Typhoon (1940)
 South of Pago Pago (1940)
 Jungle Girl (1941) serial 
 Perils of Nyoka (1942) serial
 White Savage (1943)
 She Gets Her Man (1945)
 Song of the Sarong (1945)
 Green Dolphin Street (1947)
 On the Isle of Samoa (1950)
 Bela Lugosi Meets a Brooklyn Gorilla (1952)

External links
 
 

1894 births
1972 deaths
American male film actors
Male film serial actors
Native Hawaiian people
20th-century American male actors
Native Hawaiian male actors